Bernd Kager (born 14 July 1987) is an Austrian footballer who currently plays as a midfielder for SV Oberwart.

External links

1987 births
Living people
Austrian footballers
SV Mattersburg players
SV Lafnitz players
SK Austria Klagenfurt players
Place of birth missing (living people)
Association football midfielders